Tapeinidium is a genus of ferns in the family Lindsaeaceae with about 19 species. Species are native to south-eastern Asia, from Thailand to New Guinea, and into the western Pacific. Tapeinidium pinnatum has been introduced into India.

Taxonomy
The group was first described by Carl Presl in 1851 as a subgenus, Microlepia subg. Tapeinidium. It was raised to the rank of genus by Carl Christensen in 1906. , the Checklist of Ferns and Lycophytes of the World recognized the following species:

Other species include:

Tapeinidium acuminatum Kramer
Tapeinidium atratum Kramer
Tapeinidium biserratum (Blume) Alderw.
Tapeinidium buniifolium Kramer
Tapeinidium obtusatum Alderw.
Tapeinidium oligophlebium (Baker) C.Chr.
Tapeinidium prionoides Kramer
Tapeinidium stenocarpum Alderw.

References

Lindsaeaceae
Fern genera